Anywhere may refer to:

Albums
Anywhere (Anywhere album), 2012
Anywhere (Flower Travellin' Band album), 1970
Anywhere (New Musik album), 1981

Songs
"Anywhere" (112 song), 1999
"Anywhere" (Sara Evans song), 2011
"Anywhere" (Mustard and Nick Jonas song), 2018
"Anywhere" (Rita Ora song), 2017
"Anywhere" (Beth Orton song), 2002
"Anywhere" (Page 44 song), 2007
"Anywhere" (Passenger song), 2016
"Anywhere" (Sigma song), 2018
"Anywhere" (Axle Whitehead song), 2008
"Anywhere", a song by Peakboy
"Anywhere", a song by Jule Styne and Sammy Cahn

Other uses
Anywhere (band), a psychedelic/progressive rock band
TVB Anywhere, an online pay-TV and shopping platform